Myrceugenia is a genus of evergreen woody flowering trees and shrubs belonging to the myrtle family, Myrtaceae, first described as a genus in 1855. The genus is native to South America from central Brazil to southern Chile. It is closely related to the genus Luma; some botanists include Myrceugenia in that genus.

Two species are endemic to the Juan Fernández Islands in the Pacific Ocean west of the Chilean coast. Myrceugenia fernandeziana is endemic to Robinson Crusoe Island and M. schulzei to Alejandro Selkirk Island, where they are prominent trees in the lowland and lower montane forests of the islands.

Accepted species

Myrceugenia acutiflora – S. Brazil
Myrceugenia alpigena – Brazil
Myrceugenia bocaiuvensis – Paraná
Myrceugenia bracteosa – S. Brazil
Myrceugenia brevipedicellata – Minas Gerais, São Paulo
Myrceugenia × bridgesiiMyrceugenia × bridgesii – C. Chile
Myrceugenia camargoana – Rio Grande do Sul
Myrceugenia campestris – S. Brazil
Myrceugenia chrysocarpa – S. Chile, S. Argentina
Myrceugenia colchaguensis – C. Chile
Myrceugenia correifolia – C. Chile
Myrceugenia cucullata  – S. Brazil
Myrceugenia decussata – São Paulo
Myrceugenia × diemii – C. Chile, S. Argentina
Myrceugenia euosma – S. Brazil, Paraguay, Uruguay, Misiones
Myrceugenia exsucca – C. – S. Chile, S. Argentina
Myrceugenia fernandeziana – Robinson Crusoe Island
Myrceugenia foveolata – S. Brazil
Myrceugenia franciscensis – São Paulo, Paraná
Myrceugenia gertii – S. Brazil
Myrceugenia glaucescens – Brazil, Paraguay, Uruguay, NE Argentina
Myrceugenia hamoniana – Santa Catarina
Myrceugenia hatschbachii – Paraná
Myrceugenia hoehnei –  São Paulo, Santa Catarina
Myrceugenia kleinii  –  São Paulo, Santa Catarina
Myrceugenia lanceolata – C. Chile
Myrceugenia leptospermoides – C. Chile
Myrceugenia mesomischa – Rio Grande do Sul
Myrceugenia miersiana – S. + E. Brazil
Myrceugenia myrcioides – S. + E. Brazil
Myrceugenia myrtoides – S. Brazil, Uruguay
Myrceugenia obtusa – C. Chile
Myrceugenia ovalifolia – São Paulo, Paraná
Myrceugenia ovata – S. + SE Brazil, S. Argentina, C. + S. Chile
Myrceugenia oxysepala  – S. Brazil
Myrceugenia parvifolia – C. + 
Myrceugenia pilotantha – S. Brazil
Myrceugenia pinifolia – C. Chile
Myrceugenia planipes – S. Chile, Neuquén
Myrceugenia reitzii – S. Brazil
Myrceugenia rufa – C. Chile
Myrceugenia rufescens – S. Brazil
Myrceugenia schulzei – Alejandro Selkirk Island
Myrceugenia scutellata S. Brazil
Myrceugenia seriatoramosa – SE Brazil
Myrceugenia venosa – Santa Catarina

References

External links 

Myrceugenia en Enciclopedia de la flora Chilena
 Pictures and information of Myrceugenia colchaguensis , Myrceugenia correifolia , Myrceugenia lanceolata, Myrceugenia leptospermoides , Myrceugenia obtusa  and Myrceugenia rufa 

 
Myrtaceae genera
Trees of South America
Flora of Brazil
Flora of southern South America